Jiang Hua (born 1978) is a Chinese kickboxing promoter and businessman. He is the founder of Kunlun Fight. Jiang was born in Zhoukou, China.

Career

Jiang is the chairman of Kunsun Media, the parent company of Kunlun Fight, which started in 2014 and was broadcast on Qinghai Television.

Jiang was also associated with producing Gong Shou Dao, a new form of tai chi competitions started by actor Jet Li and Alibaba founder Jack Ma.

References

External links
 

1978 births
Living people
Chinese company founders
Chinese sports executives and administrators
Kickboxing executives
Businesspeople from Beijing
Kunlun Fight
Kickboxing promoters
People from Zhoukou
Tsinghua University alumni